Dermot Robert Wyndham Bourke, 7th Earl of Mayo KP PC (Ire) (2 July 1851 – 31 December 1927) was an Anglo-Irish peer, styled Lord Naas from 1867 to 1872, who served as a representative peer in the British House of Lords (1890–1921) and member of the Senate of Southern Ireland (1921–22) and Seanad Éireann (1922–27).

Life
He succeeded as Earl of Mayo on the death of his father Richard Bourke, 6th Earl of Mayo in 1872. In 1890 he was elected as an Irish representative peer and took his seat in the House of Lords. He was appointed a Knight of the Order of St Patrick on 3 February 1905.

He was one of the four landlord representatives during the 1902 Land Conference. Between 1921 and 1922 he served in the Senate of Southern Ireland. He was nominated by W. T. Cosgrave to the Seanad of the Irish Free State on its formation in 1922. He was nominated for 12 years and served until his death in 1927.

Family
His wife, Geraldine Sarah Ponsonby (d. 29 November 1944), was the granddaughter of John Ponsonby, 4th Earl of Bessborough, and the great-granddaughter of George Coventry, 8th Earl of Coventry.

Works
 Sport In Abyssinia: Or The Mareb And Tackazzee. London: John Murray, 1876.

Arms

References

External links
 

1851 births
1927 deaths
19th-century Anglo-Irish people
20th-century Anglo-Irish people
Irish representative peers
Irish unionists
Knights of St Patrick
Irish knights
Members of the Privy Council of Ireland
Members of the 1922 Seanad
Members of the 1925 Seanad
Dermot
Members of the Senate of Southern Ireland
Independent members of Seanad Éireann
Earls of Mayo